Papillomatosis cutis carcinoides (also known as "Gottron's carcinoid papillomatosis" and "Papillomatosis cutis carcinoides of Gottron–Eisenlohr") is a cutaneous condition characterized by verrucous skin lesions, and is due to an HPV infection of the skin.

See also 
 Verrucous carcinoma
 List of cutaneous conditions
 List of verrucous carcinoma subtypes

References 

Epidermal nevi, neoplasms, and cysts